Hugo Rodriguez (born 2 April 1991) is a French professional footballer who last played as a midfielder for Stade Reims.

References

External links
Hugo Rodriguez profile at foot-national.com

1991 births
Living people
Footballers from Montpellier
French footballers
Association football midfielders
Montpellier HSC players
AC Arlésien players
Ligue 2 players